McAuley is a community northwest of Virden, Manitoba located in the Rural Municipality of Ellice – Archie.

The community was named after George W. McAuley who was the townsite owner. It was a railway point for the Canadian Pacific Railway. The post office was named Rutherglen until 1906, referencing a location in Scotland from where some of the settlers had emigrated.

References 

 McAuley, Manitoba

Geographic Names of Manitoba - the Millennium Bureau of Canada

Unincorporated communities in Westman Region